Feuerthalen is a municipality in the district of Andelfingen in the canton of Zürich in Switzerland. Langwiesen also belongs to the same municipality.

History
Feuerthalen is first mentioned in 876 as Langewisa. In 1318 it was mentioned as Fuirtal an dem Rine.

Geography

Of this area, 16.1% is used for agricultural purposes, while 43.8% is forested. Of the rest of the land, 38.6% is settled (buildings or roads) and the remainder (1.6%) is non-productive (rivers, glaciers or mountains).

It is located on the left bank of the Rhine and provided the bridgehead on that side of the river for the city of Schaffhausen. It includes the village of Langwiesen which in turn shares an international border with the municipality of Büsingen am Hochrhein which is an exclave of Germany, entirely surrounded by Swiss territory.

Demographics
, 19.4% of the population was made up of foreign nationals. Over the last 10 years the population has grown at a rate of 24%. Most of the population speaks German (91.2%), with Italian being second most common ( 3.0%) and Albanian being third ( 1.3%).

In the 2007 election the most popular party was the SVP which received 37.4% of the vote. The next three most popular parties were the SPS (20.9%), the CVP (10.7%) and the Green Party (10.4%).

The age distribution of the population is children and teenagers (0–19 years old) make up 20.9% of the population, while adults (20–64 years old) make up 60.2% and seniors (over 64 years old) make up 19%. About 76.2% of the population (between age 25-64) have completed either non-mandatory upper secondary education or additional higher education (either university or a Fachhochschule).

Feuerthalen has an unemployment rate of 2.13%. , there were 12 people employed in the primary economic sector and about 1 businesses involved in this sector. 370 people are employed in the secondary sector and there are 33 businesses in this sector. 625 people are employed in the tertiary sector, with 83 businesses in this sector.
The historical population is given in the following table:

Notable residents
Swiss-American architect Othmar Ammann was born in Feuerthalen.
Swiss opera composer Heinrich Sutermeister was born in Feuerthalen.

See also
 Feuerthalen railway station

References

External links 

  
 

Municipalities of the canton of Zürich